La Perfecta was a big band from Martinique whose styles  included cadence and compas.

Discography 

Pour toujours (DEBS, 1996)
L'inoubliable Perfecta (1979)
A youskous pas fe fou (DEBS)
Help me baby
La divinité (DEBS)
Retrouvailles (Hibiscus Records)

Album : Retrouvailles
Label : Hibiscus Records
Année : 2003

 Perfeta L'original
 Wou
 Fais Pas Si Fais Pas Ca
 L'anmou Ce Mêt
 Peyi A Ka Chalvire
 Rêverie
 Titine Makrel
 Manmaye Jodi
 Devoir De Mémoire
 La Divinité
 Ayen
 Devoir De Mémoire

Album : Pour toujours
Label : DEBS Music
Année : 1996

 Sevi ou mori
 Nou toujou la
 Dilou
 Mamy
 En nous alle
 Mon caporal
 Holyday's flight
 Pli ta pli tris
 Tcha tcha co ou

Album : 1970-1980
Label : DEBS Music

 Indicatif
 Tout' cé yo
 Hotel California
 Courage
 Crépuscule
 Manmaill' la
 Rêve moin
 La prière

Album : A youskous pas fe fou
Label : DEBS Music

Album : Help me baby

 Help me baby
 Chimin an
 Suplication
 Yo que save
 Refuge moin

Album : La divinité
Label : DEBS Music

 La divinité
 Baille chabon
 Laisse i passe
 Constatation
 Angela
 Getting out the darkness
 Il le fallait
 Si ou pas le comprend
 Fasaria

Album : La perfecta à l'atrium
Label : DEBS Music

 Clair de Lune à l'escale
 Tout bagaye paré
 A youskous
 Cuando mega si
 Getting out the darkness
 Help me baby
 Ad libitum
 Face à face
 La prière
 Chimen-an
 La divinité
 La Perfecta au Bataclan
 Interviews
 A youskous (version originale)

Album : Tout bagail parer
Label : DEBS Music

 Tout bagail parer
 A youskous pas fe fou
 Adieu fort de france et mon pays
 Chic chec choc
 Pas tchouei
 Roro deg deg
 Cadence pom pom
 Demain ke river
 Yo ke sav
 Jodi jou

References

External links
Afromix.org

Martinican musical groups